Center Point Independent School District is a public school district based in the community of Center Point, Kerr County, Texas, US.

The district's mascot is the Pirate.

In 2009, the school district was rated "academically acceptable" by the Texas Education Agency.

Schools
Center Point High (Grades 9–12)
Center Point Middle (Grades 6–8)
Center Point Elementary (Grades PK–5)

References

External links
 

School districts in Kerr County, Texas